Super Gangster (Extraordinary Gentleman) is the third studio album by rapper Styles P; it was released through Koch Records and D-Block Records on December 4, 2007. The album was supported by two singles: "Blow Ya Mind", featuring Swizz Beatz, and "Gangster, Gangster".

Track listing

Charts

Weekly charts

Year-end charts

References 

Styles P albums
2007 albums
Albums produced by Swizz Beatz
Albums produced by Hi-Tek
Albums produced by Akon
Albums produced by Pete Rock
Albums produced by the Alchemist (musician)
Albums produced by Dame Grease
Albums produced by DJ Green Lantern
E1 Music albums
D-Block Records albums
Sequel albums